Leigh  is a village and civil parish in Surrey, between Reigate, Dorking and Charlwood in the east of Mole Valley district.  The village centre is suburban and its remainder is agricultural, interspersed by four satellite clustered localities: Dawesgreen, Bunce Common, Shellwood Cross and Nalderswood which benefit from the amenities of the village and a minority of the remainder is woodland.

History
A hoard of 62 Roman silver denarii was discovered in a field at Swains Farm in 2004. The oldest of the coins dates from 31 BC and the youngest were minted in around 180 AD after the death of the emperor Marcus Aurelius.

Before the Norman Conquest, and in dwindling use afterwards, the village lay within the Reigate hundred. 
Leigh appears to have been a centre for the Wealden iron industry, and the village was explicitly exempted from a legal prohibition of making charcoal from certain timber types issued by Elizabeth I, so that iron smelting could continue.

Amenities
The Plough pub, one of two in the village (the other being The Seven Stars) is pictured above next to other homes and the village green.  In the village is a church, St Bartholomew's, and the Leigh site for the North Downs Primary School, for school years one to three.  The village has a large play area for younger children largely constructed of natural materials. Adjacent to the play area is the recreation ground, home to Leigh Cricket Club since 1900.

Localities
Each of the four communities surrounding the village is subsidiary to Leigh itself.  Nalderswood however, including by road, is almost as close to Sidlow, which is a slightly smaller village with fewer amenities.

Dawesgreen
Separated from Leigh by a buffer of less than 200m to the south, Dawesgreen is a linear settlement on a built-up crossroads including one of the village pubs, and two other listed buildings

Bunce Common
Bunce Common is on the continuation of the road east from Dawesgreen.  It is more dispersed, with plots of lower density, and has a road to Shellwood Cross.

Shellwood Cross
Shellwood Cross occupies the south-west corner of Leigh civil parish, on slopes by the upper part of the unnamed brook that flows past the east of the village centre and includes three listed buildings, one of which is a barn.

Nalderswood
Nalderswood is by a little knoll known as the Mynthurst.  The Deanoak Brook is a second tributary of the Mole, itself a tributary of the Thames, and is separated from the existing line of buildings forming most of Nalderswood by the Little Mynthurst rise.

Demography and housing
The United Kingdom Census 2011 shows an increase of more than 8% in population from 856, ten years previously.  The proportion of households in Leigh who owned their home outright was within 4% of the borough and 12% above the national average.  The proportion who owned their home with a loan was 1% greater than the national average; providing overall a higher proportion than average of rented residential property and of social housing than the national average, and above the average in Surrey.

The proportion of households in the civil parish who owned their home outright compares to the regional average of 35.1%.  The proportion who owned their home with a loan compares to the regional average of 32.5%.  The remaining % is made up of rented dwellings (plus a large % of households living rent-free).

The average level of accommodation in the region composed of detached houses was 8%, the average that was apartments was 22.6%.

Local government
At Surrey County Council, one of the 81 representatives represents the area within the Dorking Rural division.

At Mole Valley District Council most wards of the borough are deemed appropriate to be represented under the current constitution of councillors by one councillor, which is the case for Leigh.

Notable residents
 André Previn (1929-2019), pianist, composer and conductor, lived in Leigh

References

External links

 The Parish Council official Website for Leigh, Surrey

Villages in Surrey
Mole Valley
Civil parishes in Surrey